Eichenzell is a municipality in the district of Fulda, in Hesse, Germany. It is situated on the river Fulda, 7 km south of the town Fulda.

The letter processing center for Deutsche Post in the greater Fulda area is located in Eichenzell. Die Rhöner Säuwäntzt, a Skiffle-Bluesband come from Eichenzell-Lütter and use the hillbilly image of the region in their performances.

References

Fulda (district)